Anarsia amegarta is a moth in the  family Gelechiidae. It was described by Edward Meyrick in 1933. It is found in Indonesia (Java).

The larvae feed on Albizzia species.

References

amegarta
Moths described in 1933
Moths of Indonesia